San Sebastiano fuori le mura (Saint Sebastian beyond the Walls), or San Sebastiano ad Catacumbas (Saint Sebastian at the Catacombs), is a minor basilica in Rome, Central Italy. Up to the Great Jubilee of 2000, San Sebastiano was one of the Seven Pilgrim Churches of Rome, and many pilgrims still favour the traditional list (not least perhaps because of the Catacombs and because the Santuario della Madonna del Divino Amore, which replaced it in the list, is farther from the inner city).

History

Built originally in the first half of the 4th century, the basilica is dedicated to St. Sebastian, a popular Roman martyr of the 3rd century. The name ad catacumbas refers to the catacombs of St Sebastian, over which the church was built, while "fuori le mura" refers to the fact that the church is built outside the Aurelian Walls, and is used to differentiate the basilica from the church of San Sebastiano al Palatino on the Palatine Hill.

According to the founding tradition, in 258, during the Valerian persecutions, the catacombs were temporarily used as place of sepulture of two other saints martyred in Rome, Peter and Paul, whose remains were later transferred to the two basilicas carrying their names: whence the original dedication of the church, Basilica Apostolorum ("Basilica of the Apostles"). The dedication to Sebastian dates to the 9th century.

Sebastian's remains were moved here around 350. They were transferred to St. Peter's in 826, fearing a Saracen assault: the latter, in fact, materialized, and the church was destroyed. The building was refounded under Pope Nicholas I (858–867), while the martyr's altar was reconsecrated by Honorius III (1216–1227), by request of the Cistercians, who had received the place. In the 13th century the arcade of the triple nave was walled in.

S. Sebastiano is one of the seven basilicas travellers to Rome traditionally visited, especially after 1553 when St. Philip Neri, initiated the Seven Churches Visitation, a special pilgrimage done in one day starting from St. Peter's Basilica and ending at the Basilica di Santa Maria Maggiore. The street which links Basilica of Saint Paul Outside the Walls with S. Sebastiano is still called "Via delle Sette Chiese".

The current edifice is largely a 17th-century construction, commissioned by Cardinal Scipione Borghese in 1609 from Flaminio Ponzio and, after Ponzio's death in 1613, entrusted to Giovanni Vasanzio, who completed it.

Overview

The statue of St Sebastian at the altar in the first chapel on the left is by Giuseppe Giorgetti. The Chapel of Relics, located directly across the nave, houses a stone allegedly imprinted with the footprints of Jesus related to the episode of "Quo vadis?" in the apocryphal Acts of Peter; and one of the arrows which struck St Sebastian together with part of the column to which he was tied during the martyrdom. Noteworthy is the Albani Chapel (built 1716) and designed by Carlo Maratta, Alessandro Specchi, Filippo Barigioni and Carlo Fontana;  commissioned by Pope Clement XI; and dedicated to Pope Fabian. Fabian had been Bishop of Rome during the persecution of Decius. Flanking the altar, busts of Saints Peter and Paul by Nicolò Cordier recall the first dedication of the basilica.

Bernini

On the right side in a niche, the famous Bust of the Saviour (Salvator Mundi), the last masterpiece by Gian Lorenzo Bernini rediscovered in 2001 in the convent adjacent to the church, is shown.

Burials
Quirinus of Sescia
Pope Fabian

See also
 Santa Maria in Palmis

Notes

References
Paolo Coen, Le sette chiese. Le basiliche giubilari romane, Newton Compton, Rome, 1994.
 Claudio Rendina, Enciclopedia di Roma, Newton Compton, Rome, 2000.
 "San Sebastiano fuori le Mura", by Chris Nyborg.

External links
 "San Sebastiano fuori le Mura" site

Sebastiano
Sebastiano
Sebastiano fuori le mura
Sebastiano fuori le mura
Rome Q. XX Ardeatino
Saint Sebastian